Artemia salina is a species of brine shrimp – aquatic crustaceans that are more closely related to Triops and cladocerans than to true shrimp.

Artemia salina is native to saline lakes, ponds and temporary waters (not seas) in the Mediterranean region of Southern Europe, Anatolia and Northern Africa. Considerable taxonomic confusion exists and some populations elsewhere have formerly been referred to as this species, but are now recognized as separate species.

Description 
Their blood contains the pigment hemoglobin, which is also found in vertebrates. Males differ from females by having the second antennae markedly enlarged, and modified into clasping organs used in mating.

Life cycle

Males have two reproductive organs. Prior to copulation the male clasps the female with his clasping organ, assuming a dorsal position. The claspers hold the female just anterior to the ovisac. Male and female may swim clasped together for a number of days. In this state, the movements of the swimming appendages of the pair beat in a co-ordinated fashion. The females can produce eggs either as a result of mating or via parthenogenesis. There are two types of eggs: thin-shelled eggs that hatch immediately and thick-shelled eggs, which can remain in a dormant state. These cysts can last for a number of years, and will hatch when they are placed in saltwater. Thick-shelled eggs are produced when the body of water is drying out, food is scarce, and the salt concentration is rising. If the female dies, the eggs develop further. Eggs hatch into nauplii that are about 0.5 mm in length. They have a single simple eye that only senses the presence and direction of light. Nauplii swim towards the light but adult individuals swim away from it. Later, the two more capable eyes develop but the initial eye also stays, resulting in three-eyed creatures.

Ecology
In nature, they live in salt lakes. They are almost never found in an open sea, most likely because of the lack of food and relative defenselessness. However, Artemia have been observed in Elkhorn Slough, California, which is connected to the sea. However, North American populations are another species, A. franciscana. Unlike most aquatic animals, Artemia swims upside down.

Artemia can live in water having much more or much less salt content than normal seawater. They tolerate salt amounts as high as 50%, which is nearly a saturated solution, and can live for several days in solutions very different from  sea water, such as potassium permanganate or silver nitrate, while iodine—a frequent addition to edible salt—is harmful to them. The animal's colour depends on the salt concentration, with high concentrations giving them a slightly red appearance. In fresh water, Artemia salina dies after about an hour. It feeds mainly on green algae.

The species formerly lived in a number of salt works based around the Solent. They were observed only in the brine tanks where the concentrated salt water was held before boiling, but were probably also present in the salt pans. At least some of the salt harvesters thought they helped clean the brine and would deliberately introduce them into the tanks. With the decline of the salt works the species became extinct in England.

Uses
The resilience of these creatures makes them ideal test samples in experiments. Artemia is one of the standard organisms for testing the toxicity of chemicals including screening for insecticidal activity  being used to by Blizzard et al 1989 to screen hundreds of semisynthetic avermectins, and by Conder et al 1992 for the Streptomyces fumanus metabolite dioxapyrrolomycin. In addition, the eggs survive for years. Hence it is possible to buy eggs and also "Artemia growing kits" for children, containing eggs, salt, food and most necessary tools. These have been most popularly marketed under the name Sea-Monkeys. Shops catering for aquarists also sell frozen Artemia as fish food. Artemia occurs in vast numbers in the Great Salt Lake where it is commercially important. However, nowadays it is believed that the brine shrimp of this lake is another species, A. franciscana.

Taxonomy, distribution and conservation
Artemia salina was first described (as Cancer salinus) by Carl Linnaeus in his  in 1758. This was based on a report by a German called Schlosser, who had found Artemia at Lymington, England. That population is now extirpated, although specimens collected there are retained in zoological museums.

As presently defined, A. salina is restricted to the Mediterranean region of Southern Europe, Anatolia and Northern Africa. Some populations elsewhere have formerly been referred to as this species, but are now recognized as separate, including  A. franciscana of the Americas. That species has been widely introduced to places outside its native range, including the Mediterranean region, where it locally outcompetes the native A. salina. This has already happened in parts of Portugal, Spain, France, Italy and Morocco.

An alternative taxonomic treatment is to recognized the extirpated English population as a species of its own, to which the name A. salina should be restricted. In that case the species native to the Mediterranean region of Southern Europe, Anatolia and Northern Africa can be referred to as A. tunisiana, but at present most authorities reject this treatment and consider A. tunisiana as a synonym of A. salina. Some have considered the North African population distinct and proposed that the name A. tunisiana should be restricted to it, but this is contradicted by genetic evidence, which shows that South European and North African populations belong to the same species.

References

Anostraca
Commercial crustaceans
Crustaceans described in 1758
Taxa named by Carl Linnaeus